In statistics, the Phillips–Perron test (named after Peter C. B. Phillips and Pierre Perron) is a unit root test. That is, it is used in time series analysis to test the null hypothesis that a time series is integrated of order 1. Like the augmented Dickey–Fuller test, the Phillips–Perron test addresses the issue that the process generating data for  might have a higher order of autocorrelation than is admitted in the test equation—making  endogenous and thus invalidating the Dickey–Fuller t-test. The test is robust with respect to unspecified autocorrelation and heteroscedasticity in the disturbance process of the test equation.

Davidson and MacKinnon (2004) report that the Phillips–Perron test performs worse in finite samples than the augmented Dickey–Fuller test.

References

Statistical tests